Ponto Final (meaning Full Stop in English) is a Portuguese-language newspaper published daily in Macau, founded on December 18, 1991. It was known for its critical stance against the Rocha Vieira administration.

History
Ponto Final was originally published weekly, but was later changed to a daily publication and has been published today. It added an English supplement in 1999.

References

External links
  

Newspapers published in Macau
1991 establishments in Macau